Pépé Bonet Kapambu (born 13 February 2003) is a Congolese professional footballer who plays as a goalkeeper for Red Star.

Career
On 10 July 2019, Bonet signed his first professional contract with Rennes. He made his professional debut with Rennes in a 1–0 UEFA Europa League loss to CFR Cluj on 24 October 2019.

On 22 June 2022, Bonet signed with Red Star.

References

External links
 
 
 Stade Rennais Profile

2003 births
Living people
Footballers from Kinshasa
Democratic Republic of the Congo footballers
Association football goalkeepers
Stade Rennais F.C. players
Red Star F.C. players
Championnat National 3 players
Democratic Republic of the Congo expatriate footballers
Democratic Republic of the Congo expatriate sportspeople in France
Expatriate footballers in France